The Men's Rings gymnastic event at the 2015 Pan American Games was held on July 14 at the Toronto Coliseum.

Schedule
All times are Eastern Standard Time (UTC-3).

Results

Qualification

Final

References

Gymnastics at the 2015 Pan American Games